Cathy or Kathy Kennedy may refer to:

Cathy Kennedy, editor of APC (magazine)
Cathy Kennedy, character played by Patricia Brake
Kathy Kennedy, National Cowgirl Museum and Hall of Fame

See also
Catherine Kennedy (disambiguation)